The 2019 Football Championship of Ternopil Oblast was won by Ahron-OTH Velyki Haï.

League table

References

Football
Ternopil
Ternopil